Kanubhai Karamshibhai Patel is an Indian politician, member of the Gujarat Legislative Assembly for Sanand, Minister of State for Finance, Energy and Petrochemicals in the Government of Gujarat and a member of the Bhartiya Janata Party. Mr. Patel belong to the Koli caste of Gujarat.

References 

1985 births

Living people
Indian politicians
People from Gujarat